The West Marin Citizen was a weekly newspaper based in Point Reyes Station, California, that covered the western region of Marin County. After a pilot edition, the paper published its first issue on July 5, 2007. In the following years through April 2015, the newspaper engaged in a two-paper competition for limited readership and advertising dollars in a rural area where both were relatively scarce.

Joel Hack launched the Citizen in reaction to the purchase of the Point Reyes Light, a long-established, Pulitzer Prize-winning newspaper also based in Point Reyes Station, by Robert Plotkin, who owned the paper between 2005-2010. The change in ownership, after the $500,000 sale by long-time owner and editor Dave Mitchell, had led to a different editorial tone and staff changes. Former Light managing editor Jim Kravets was the paper's first editor.

Contributors included members of the local Latino Photography Project, whose work ran as an ongoing series called "La Vida". In August 2008, the Citizen won six awards from the National Newspaper Association based on the paper's first six months of reporting.
 
In mid-2008, a group of residents formed a limited liability company with the intent of merging the Light and Citizen to create a single community-owned newspaper, but by the end of the year, could not come to terms with the Light'''s publisher on a price or the terms of the proposed buyout. The group, reconstituted as the Marin Media Alliance, focused its effort towards community ownership solely on the Citizen. The effort was not successful.

In October 2010, Hack retired as editor and publisher, turning the paper over to advertising director Linda Petersen. Under her watch, The Citizen leaned more toward features and reader-contributed pieces, while the Light worked on a more traditional newspaper model of reporters filing news stories. But financial struggles affected both papers and left Peterson with no paid staff. In April 2015, she sold the paper to the Light'' for $50,000.

References

External links
 Point Reyes Light'

Newspapers published in the San Francisco Bay Area
Mass media in Marin County, California
Publications established in 2007
Weekly newspapers published in California